FC Tsementnik Kant is a Kyrgyzstani football club based in Kant, Kyrgyzstan.

History 

 1992: Founded as FC Tsementnik Kant.
 2001: Renamed to FC KTsShK Kant.
 2002: Renamed to FC Tsementnik Kant.

FC Tsementnik Kant started in the 1995 season.

Achievements 

 Kyrgyzstan League:
8th place: 1995

 Kyrgyzstan Cup:
1/8 finals: 1992, 2002

References

External links 

 Profile at footballfacts.ru

Football clubs in Kyrgyzstan
1992 establishments in Kyrgyzstan
Association football clubs established in 1992